Pedinocerops is a genus of flies in the family Stratiomyidae.

Distribution
Papua New Guinea.

Species
Pedinocerops ornatifrons (Hollis, 1963)
Pedinocerops pendleburyi (Hollis, 1963)
Pedinocerops radians (Walker, 1857)
Pedinocerops robusta James, 1980

References

Stratiomyidae
Diptera of Australasia
Diptera of Asia
Brachycera genera
Endemic fauna of Papua New Guinea